My God may refer to:

My God (album), an album by Flotsam and Jetsam, or the title song
"Ratziti Sheteda" (often called "My God" in English), an Israeli song composed by Uzi Hitman
"My God", a song by Alice Cooper from Lace and Whiskey
"My God", a song by Audio Adrenaline from Audio Adrenaline
"My God", a song by Gemma Hayes from Night on My Side
"My God", a song by Natalie Imbruglia from Come to Life
"My God", a song by Pusha T from Fear of God and Fear of God II: Let Us Pray
"My God", a song by Hillsong London from Shout God's Fame
"My God", a song by Jethro Tull from Aqualung
"My God", a song by Joss Stone from the Japanese edition of Introducing Joss Stone
"My God", a song by Pennywise from Land of the Free?
"My God", a song by Jeremy Camp from Reckless
My God (film), a 2015 Malayalam-language film

See also
Oh My God (disambiguation)
God (disambiguation)